Harper House may refer to:

Locations

United States
Robert Atlas Harper House, Greenwood, Arkansas, listed on the National Register of Historic Places (NRHP) in Sebastian County
Roy Harper House, Romance, Arkansas, listed on the NRHP in White County
 Harper House (Montverde, Florida), NRHP-listed
Bailey-Harper House-Doctors Building, Gainesville, Georgia, listed on the NRHP in Hall County
Carroll-Harper House, Cave Spring, Georgia, listed on the NRHP in Floyd County
Roe-Harper House, Milledgeville, Georgia, listed on the NRHP in Baldwin County, Georgia
John B. Harper House, Palestine, Illinois, NRHP-listed
 Harper House (Rock Island, Illinois), 19th century hotel (demolished) in Rock Island, Illinois
Harper Family House, Limerick, Maine, listed on the NRHP in York County
Phoenix Hall-Johnson-Harper House, Raymond, Mississippi, listed on the NRHP in Hinds County
 Harper House (Archdale, North Carolina), listed on the NRHP in Randolph County
 Harper House (Harper, North Carolina), listed on the NRHP in Johnston County
Rice Harper House, Sandusky, Ohio, listed on the NRHP in Sandusky, Ohio
Samuel Harper Stone House, New Concord, Ohio, NRHP-listed
William Rainey Harper Log House, New Concord, Ohio, NRHP-listed
 Frances Ellen Watkins Harper House, Philadelphia, Pennsylvania, a National Historic Landmark
Harper-Chesser House, Georgetown, Texas, listed on the NRHP in Williamson County
Alfred William Harper House, Lindon, Utah, listed on the NRHP in Utah County
Harper House (Stuarts Draft, Virginia), listed on the NRHP in Augusta County
F. C. Harper House, Port Townsend, Washington, listed on the NRHP in Jefferson County

Other
 The Harper House, a 2021 animated television series